Parts of F Street and 7th Street, N.W. and nearby blocks have historically been the heart of the Washington, D.C. downtown shopping district. In the first half of the 20th century there were numerous upscale large department stores along and near F Street, while 7th Street housed more economical emporia and large retail furniture stores. The F street corridor stretches west from Downtown's Penn Quarter and Gallery Place towards 15th Street while the 7th Street corridor includes Penn Quarter, Chinatown and Mount Vernon Square neighborhoods and extends up to the border of Shaw.

History
Center Market, the city's largest public market, opened in 1872 operating until 1931 on the site of today's National Archives Building. Its northern end faced Pennsylvania Avenue between 7th and 9th street. Transportation by Washington, D.C.'s streetcars, first horse-drawn, then electrified, notably the busy transfer point at F and 9th, helped solidify this area as D.C.'s most popular shopping district during that time.

Current retail
Although Macy's is the only traditional department store left, the district is home to four discount department stores, three small malls or shopping centers, and many on-street retail stores such as H&M, Anthropologie, etc.

From north to south and east to west:
 from Gallery Pl. (G St.) to H St., from 6th to 7th, Gallery Place, a small urban power center with Bed, Bath & Beyond, Urban Outfitters, and Regal Cinemas
 on D from 8th to 9th, south side, site of the former Kann's department store (1893–1975); original store was on the NE corner of 8th and Market Space (now the north side of Navy Memorial plaza)
 on the block bounded by H, I, 9th and 10th streets, CityCenterDC shopping center, housing luxury boutiques (Hermès, etc.)
 on the block bounded by F, G, 10th and 11th streets, former flagship of the Woodward & Lothrop department store chain (1887–1996) reopened in 2003 and currently houses H&M, Forever 21 and Zara.
 on E from 11th to 12th, District Center with Nordstrom Rack and Saks Off Fifth discount department stores
 on F from 12th to 13th, north side, T.J. Maxx discount department store
 on G from 12th to 13th, north side, Macy's department store (was a Hecht's, built to replace the flagship, operated 1985-2006)
 on F from 13th to 14th, south side, Marshalls discount department store at The Shops at the National Press Building
 on Pennsylvania Avenue from 13th to 14th, The Shops at National Place, formerly a small urban mall, now with a few retail shops and a food court

Sites of department stores and other notable stores

From north to south and east to west:
 on F from 6th to 7th, south side, the former flagship of Hecht's department store
1316-24 7th St NW (W side North of N), Harry Kaufman’s Stores department store
7th and K (SW corner, 706 K St NW): site of Hahn's shoe emporium, flagship of a regional chain
7th street both sides of K: Goldberg's department store (912-928 7th St., 706 K St.)
 7th Street at United States Navy Memorial Plaza, site of the first Saks and Co. stores (1867, larger store built on same site, 1887)
 on E west of 8th, south side, former Lansburgh's department store (1882–1973)
 SW corner I and 7th, 814 7th St. NW, site of King's Palace department store that operated 1860s through the 1930s. 1914 renovation by Frederick B. Pyle
 on the block bounded by F, G, 10th and 11th streets, former flagship of the Woodward & Lothrop department store chain (1887–1996) reopened in 2003 and currently houses H&M, Forever 21 and Zara.
 11th and G, site of the second (1893) location of the Palais Royal department store
 Pennsylvania and 12th, northeast corner, site of the original (1870s-1880s) Palais Royal department store, the Centennial Building, at times also home to Bureau of Pensions and the Raleigh Hotel.
 on F, NW corner of 14th, former flagship of Garfinckel's (1930–1990)

7th Street furniture retailers
In the late 19th and early 20th century, 7th Street north of F, as far as O Street in today's Shaw district, was home not only to several of the more economical large department stores such as Goldberg's and Harry Kaufman's, but to the city's concentration of furniture retailers. These included (from north to south):
 1015 7th Street – Alperstein’s Furniture, 1904 – present
 932 7th Street – John Rudden’s New Furniture, 1880s
 National Furniture
 921 7th Street – House & Herrmann, 1886
 Marlo Furniture, 1963
 915 7th Street – Jackson Brothers, 1903
 819 7th Street – Samuel W. Augenstein, pre-1891
 Peter Grogan’s Furniture Company, 1891–1933
 Peerless Furniture Company, 1935–1968
 Home Furniture and Appliance Company, May 1969-1972
 801 7th Street – John Rudden’s New Furniture, 1899
 718 7th Street – Anton Eberly & Sons, 1868
 Mayer Dodek, Dodek’s Furniture & Clothing, 1898
 515 Seventh Street – Hecht's Department Store
 7th and D, southeast corner – The Hub Furniture Store, 1855

Map
 *site

References

Streets in Washington, D.C.
Shopping districts and streets in Washington, D.C.